In the mathematical theory of Kleinian groups, the Riley slice of Schottky space is a family of Kleinian groups generated by two parabolic elements. 

Definition

The Riley slice consists of the complex numbers ρ such that the two matrices

generate  Kleinian group G with regular set Ω such that Ω/G is a 4-times punctured sphere.

The Riley slice is the quotient of the Teichmuller space of a 4-times punctured sphere by a group generated by Dehn twists around a curve, and so is topologically an annulus.

See also

Bers slice

References

Kleinian groups